Marco Tobón Mejía (1876-1933) was a Colombian sculptor, draughtsman, and painter. He lived in France for almost all his career, where he met and formed relationships with several prominent artists, including Auguste Rodin, Aristide Maillol, and Antoine Bourdelle. He worked mostly within neoclassic and art nouveau styles, and is known especially for his sculptures in bronze, electroplate, and pewter. Several of his pieces can be found in the Colombian National Museum.

His marble statues Poetry and The Silence are dedicated to the Colombian poet José Asunción Silva.

Biography
Tobón was born in Santa Rosa de Osos, near Medellín, Colombia. His artistic career began with drawing and painting. While in Colombia, he studied with Francisco Antonio Cano, and together they contributed to the magazine  Lectura y arte (Reading and Art). During his residence in Cuba between 1905 and 1909, he also did covers and illustrations for the magazine Le Figaro and others.  From 1910 to 1930, he created several small bronze reliefs of academic nudes. He died in Paris at the age of 57.

Selected works
 Statue to Cisneros in Plaza Cisneros, Medellín, Colombia
 Poetry (La Poesia), 1914, female nude in white marble, Colombian National Museum
 The Silence (El Silencio), Colombian National Museum
 Sculpture of José María Cordoba
 Monument to the Flag, 1931, November 11 Park
 Tombstone for Pedro Justo Berrío

References

1876 births
1933 deaths
Colombian sculptors
Draughtsmen
Art Nouveau sculptors
People from Antioquia Department
20th-century sculptors